Roz Ryan (born Rosalyn Bowen; July 7, 1951) is an American actress, singer, and comedian who has worked for productions in film, television, and Broadway theatre for over 40 years. Ryan's first role on Broadway was in Ain't Misbehavin', a Fats Waller-influenced musical revue that debuted in 1978. She is well known for her part in the television show, Amen, for her character Amelia Hetebrink, for being the voice of Thalia, the Muse of Comedy in the 1997 Disney animated film, Hercules, and for guest starring on the Disney Channel sitcom, K.C. Undercover as Grandma Gayle.

Life and career
Ryan was born Rosalyn Bowen in Detroit, Michigan, the daughter of Gertrude and Thomas Bowen, who worked for the Board of Education. She is a 1969 graduate of Mackenzie High School. For 13 years, Ryan worked as a nightclub singer in Detroit before a friend suggested she audition for Ain't Misbehavin, a Broadway musical revue featuring the music of Fats Waller. Her audition was successful, and she was on stage only 10 days later. Ryan continued to star in numerous Broadway musicals including the Tony Award-winning Chicago, for which she holds the record of longest tenure for the character Matron "Mama" Morton. Other plays Ryan has appeared in are A Christmas Carol, Dreamgirls, One Mo' Time, and the 2006 revival of The Pajama Game.

In television and film, Ryan is better known for her roles as Amelia Hetebrink on Amen, Mrs. Dixon on Good News and Flo Anderson on All About the Andersons.  She also guest starred on an episode on Barbershop. She was the voice of Thalia, the Muse of Comedy in Disney's animated film Hercules and Hercules: The Animated Series. She is the voice of Bubbie the whale in the 2008 animated television series The Marvelous Misadventures of Flapjack. She had roles in the films  I Think I Love My Wife, The Invention of Lying and Waiting for Forever. She voices Kick's teacher Ms. Fitzpatrick in the animated series Kick Buttowski: Suburban Daredevil. She was the voice of Witch Lezah in The Looney Tunes Show. She has also played Jake's female and feline counterpart Cake in the Adventure Time episodes "Fionna and Cake", "Bad Little Boy", "The Prince Who Wanted Everything", and "Five Short Tables". She has also starred in TVOne's The Rickey Smiley Show.

She most recently starred on Broadway in Scandalous: The Life and Trials of Aimee Semple McPherson. In late May 2016 Ryan begun her 13th run in Chicago as Matron "Mama" Morton.

Broadway stage
 Scandalous: The Life and Trials of Aimee Semple McPherson (2012)
 The Pajama Game (2006)
 One Mo' Time (2002)
 Chicago (1996–2019)
 Dreamgirls (1981–1985)
 Ain't Misbehavin' (1978–1981)

Filmography

Film

Television

Video Games

References

External links
Official site

1951 births
Living people
Actresses from Detroit
African-American actresses
American women singers
American film actresses
American stage actresses
American television actresses
American voice actresses
Mackenzie High School (Michigan) alumni
20th-century American actresses
21st-century American actresses
20th-century African-American women
20th-century African-American people
21st-century African-American women
21st-century African-American people